The 1940 Northwestern Wildcats team was an American football team that represented Northwestern University during the 1940 Big Ten Conference football season. In their sixth year under head coach Pappy Waldorf, the Wildcats compiled a 6–2 record (4–2 against Big Ten Conference opponents), finished in third place in the Big Ten Conference, and were ranked No. 8 in the final AP Poll. Their only losses came against No. 1 Minnesota and No. 3 Michigan.  They played their home games at Dyche Stadium in Evanston, Illinois.

Schedule

Players
 Alf Bauman – tackle (consensus 1st-team All-American; 1st-team All-Big Ten selection by AP and UP)
 Ollie Hahnenstein – halfback (2nd-team All-Big Ten selection by AP and UP)
 Paul Hiemenz – center (1st-team All-Big Ten selection by AP and UP)
 Joe Lokane – guard (1st-team All-Big Ten selection by AP and UP)

References

Northwestern
Northwestern Wildcats football seasons
Northwestern Wildcats football